Katsunaga (written: 雄永, 勝永 or 勝長) is a masculine Japanese given name. Notable people with the name include:

 (1851–1884), Japanese daimyō
 (died 1569), Japanese samurai
 (1577–1615), Japanese samurai
 (1568–1582), Japanese samurai

Japanese masculine given names